Wasembo, also known as Biapim, Gusap, and Yankowan, is a Madang language spoken in Madang Province, Papua New Guinea. Usher classifies it as being closest to the Yaganon languages.

References

External links
Rosetta Project: Wasembo Swadesh list

East Madang languages
Languages of Madang Province